Claude Boucher is a Canadian diplomat. He is the former Ambassador Extraordinary and Plenipotentiary to Haiti. He is currently a candidate for the Liberal Party of Canada in the federal riding of Levis-Lotbinière (formerly known as Lotbinière—Chutes-de-la-Chaudière.)

External links 
 Foreign Affairs and International Trade Canada Complete List of Posts
 

Ambassadors of Canada to Haiti
Year of birth missing (living people)
Living people
Place of birth missing (living people)